HK Lokomotiv Moscow was an ice hockey team in Moscow, Russia (then Soviet Union). They played in the Soviet Championship League, and various other lower-level Soviet leagues from 1947-1983.

History
The club was founded in 1947 as part of the Lokomotiv Moscow sports club. In their first season, they took part in the Klass B, the second level of Soviet hockey. In 1949, the club won the Klass B and was promoted to the Klass A, the top level of Soviet hockey.

Under the guidance of coach Alexander Novokreschtschenov the team in its premiere season finished in twelfth place, and were relegated to the Klass B. In the 1960-61 season, they finished in third place in the Klass A, the best finish in their history. In 1970, the club was relegated to the Klass B, but were promoted to the Klass A just a year later. The club won the multi-national invitational tournament, the Spengler Cup, in the 1967 and 1969 seasons. The 1971-72 season was the team's last in the Klass A, they finished with only five wins in 32 games, and they were relegated after the season. From 1979-1982, while the Sokolniki Ice Palace was being renovated, Lokomotiv played its home games at the Moscow Sports Palace.

After the 1982-83 season, the ice hockey section of Lokomotiv Moscow was dissolved, due to falling popularity, and low attendance.

Achievements
Spengler Cup champion (2): 1967, 1969.
Klass B champion (2): 1949, 1971.

Notable players

 Viktor Yakushev
 Yevgeni Zimin
 Boris Mikhailov
 Vladimir Khrushchev
 Yevgeni Mishakov
 Alexander Pashkov	
 Nikolai Epschtein
 Yury Tsitsinov
 Victor Tsyplakov

See also

 FC Lokomotiv Moscow
 RC Lokomotiv Moscow

External links
Club profile on hockeyarenas.net

Defunct ice hockey teams in Russia
Sports clubs in Moscow
Ice hockey clubs established in 1947
Sports clubs disestablished in 1983
1947 establishments in Russia
1980s disestablishments in Russia
FC Lokomotiv Moscow